Jonas David Kröper (born 25 August 1990), also known by his stage name Jonasu, is a German DJ, record producer and songwriter based in Berlin, Germany. His single "Black Magic" charted in the top 5 in the UK and Ireland in July 2021.

Early life
Born in Mannheim, Germany, he attended the Johann Sebastian Bach Gymnasium before studying jazz drums at the  Conservatory of Amsterdam.

Career
In 2020, Jonasu received two Buma Awards for co-writing the song "Post Malone" by Sam Feldt featuring Rani.  He produced the 2020 single "Pon It" by New Zealand rapper JessB. After being used in an episode of British dating game show Love Island in June 2021, his 2020 single "Black Magic" registered a 59% increase in daily Spotify streams and entered the top 40 of the UK Singles Chart.

Discography
 Cutting Through Noise (2022)

Singles

External links

References 

1990 births
21st-century German male musicians
Living people
Musicians from Mannheim
Electronic dance music DJs
German DJs
German record producers
German songwriters